Saltus may refer to:

People
Edgar Saltus (1855–1921), American writer known for his highly refined prose style
Francis Saltus Saltus (1849–1889), American poet
Thomas Saltus Lubbock (1817–1862), Texas Ranger and soldier in the Confederate army during the American Civil War

Latin
The Latin word saltus (pl. saltūs) meaning "leap," as in:
Natura non facit saltus ("nature does not make jumps"), a principle of natural philosophy; hence in scientific usage:
Saltation (biology)
Saltation (geology)
Saltatory conduction
 Saltus lunae, a "leap of the moon" in Christian calendar computation; see computus
See also Sault, a pre-17th century French form meaning "falls" derived from Latin saltus, found in many place names
 Saltus meaning "wooded area" or "wilderness," as in:
Saltus Teutoburgiensis or Teutoburg Forest
Hercynius saltus, one of the Latin names for the Hercynian Forest
Carbonarius saltus or Silva Carbonaria, the "charcoal forest" in Belgium
Saltus Vasconum, a Roman term for territory inhabited by the Vascones or ancient Basques
Saltus Tariotarum; see Tariotes
 Saltus, a unit of area equal to about 200 ha or 500 acres; see

Places, schools, and businesses
 Saltus, a Byzantine name for Salt, Jordan
 Saltus, a town in San Bernardino County, California
 Saltus Grammar School, in Pembroke Parish, Bermuda
 Saltus Island, an island of Bermuda
 Saltus Grocery Store, in Burlington, Vermont

Zoology
Amblyseius saltus, a species of mite in the family Amblyseius
 Lysiteles saltus, a species of spider in the genus Lysiteles
 Aprostocetus saltus, a species of insect in the genus Aprostocetus

Other
 Saltus Award, awarded by the American Numismatic Society; see List of Saltus Award winners
 A type of wrench